Lovenella is a genus of cnidarians belonging to the family Lovenellidae.

The genus has cosmopolitan distribution.

Species:

Lovenella annae 
Lovenella assimilis 
Lovenella bermudensis 
Lovenella chiquita 
Lovenella clausa 
Lovenella corrugata 
Lovenella gracilis 
Lovenella grandis 
Lovenella haichangensis 
Lovenella macrogona 
Lovenella nodosa 
Lovenella polyconcretus 
Lovenella rugosa 
Lovenella sinuosa

References

Lovenellidae
Hydrozoan genera